Carhuahuaran Sign Language is a multigenerational family sign language of the Quechua-speaking region of Peru.

References

Village sign languages
Sign languages of Peru